Thomas Powers is an author.

Thomas Powers may also refer to:

Thomas E. Powers (1808–1876), Vermont doctor, newspaper editor and politician 
Thomas J. Powers, American politician in Monmouth County, New Jersey
Thomas W. Powers, American Catholic priest

See also
Tom Powers (disambiguation)
Thomas Power (disambiguation)